Nathaniel Charles Rothschild (9 May 1877 – 12 October 1923), known as "Charles", was an English banker and entomologist and a member of the Rothschild family. He is remembered for The Rothschild List, a list he made in 1915 of 284 sites across Britain that he considered suitable for nature reserves.

Family

Nathaniel "Charles" Rothschild was the son of Nathan Rothschild, 1st Baron Rothschild, and Emma Rothschild (née von Rothschild), who were cousins and Jewish members of the Rothschild banking clan. Charles predeceased his older brother Walter Rothschild, 2nd Baron Rothschild (1868–1937), who died without issue. The peerage therefore passed to Charles's son Victor Rothschild, 3rd Baron Rothschild. Charles boarded at Harrow School, which he found somewhat traumatising for incidents of bullying on account of his religion.

He worked as a partner in the family bank NM Rothschild and Sons in London. He went to Rothschild's Bank every morning; despite all his interest in science and in natural history, he never missed a day. He was also very interested in the gold refinery operated by Rothschild's, and invented a variety of devices for collecting gold, and working on gold from a scientific point of view.  He also became Chairman of the Alliance Assurance Company.

Career

Entomology
Like his zoologist brother Walter, Charles devoted much of his energies to entomology and natural history collecting. His enormous collection of some 260,000 fleas is now in the Rothschild Collection at the Natural History Museum; he described about 500 new flea species. One of these, which he discovered and named, was the Bubonic plague vector flea, Xenopsylla cheopis, also known as the oriental rat flea, which he collected at Shendi, Sudan, on an expedition in 1901, publishing his finding in 1903.

Nature conservation

Rothschild is regarded as a pioneer of nature conservation in Britain, and is credited with establishing the UK's first nature reserve when he bought Wicken Fen, near Ely, in 1899.  Wicken Fen was presented to the National Trust but the Trust declined to take Woodwalton Fen, near Huntingdon, which Rothschild bought in 1910, and this wetland, now a National Nature Reserve, was kept as a private nature reserve. In 1911 Rothschild built a bungalow at Woodwalton Fen as a base for fields trips, which still stands. During his lifetime he built and managed his estate at Ashton Wold in Northamptonshire to maximise its suitability for wildlife, especially butterflies. He was concerned about the loss of wildlife habitats, and in 1912 set up the Society for the Promotion of Nature Reserves, the forerunner of The Wildlife Trusts partnership. In 1915 he produced "The Rothschild List", a schedule of the best 284 wildlife sites in the country, some of which were purchased as nature reserves.

Public service
As well as a Lieutenant of the City of London, Rothschild became a JP for the county of Northamptonshire in 1902.  He served as High Sheriff of Northamptonshire for 1905.

Personal life
In 1907, Rothschild married Rózsika Edle von Wertheimstein (1870–1940), a descendant of an old Austrian-Jewish family that was ennobled long before the Rothschilds. She was born in 1870 at Nagyvárad, Hungary (now the Romanian city of Oradea), the daughter of a retired army officer, Baron Alfred Edler von Wertheimstein. Rózsika was one of seven children and had been a champion lawn tennis player in Hungary.

After their marriage on 6 February 1907, they lived at Tring and in London. Rothschild, who worked in the family's banking business, was a dedicated naturalist in his spare time: the young couple had met on a butterfly-collecting trip in the Carpathian Mountains. In the evening, they might go together to a concert or a dinner party, but he really preferred to sort out his butterflies. Together, they had four children:

 Miriam Louisa Rothschild (1908–2005), a zoologist
 Elizabeth Charlotte Rothschild (1909–1988), known as "Liberty"
 Nathaniel Mayer Victor Rothschild (1910–1990), known as "Victor", 3rd Baron Rothschild.
 Kathleen Annie Pannonica Rothschild (1913–1988), known as "Nica", a bebop jazz enthusiast and patroness of Thelonious Monk and Charlie Parker

Suffering from encephalitis, in 1923 Rothschild committed suicide.  His suicide, when he was 46 years old, was a severe shock to his wife and four children. Rózsika died on 30 June 1940.

Ancestry

See also
History of the Jews in England
Rothschild banking family of England

References
Notes

Sources
 Rothschild, Miriam (1983) Dear Lord Rothschild 
 Reminiscences by Rozsika's daughter, Dame Miriam Rothschild, published in the Jewish Quarterly

1877 births
1923 deaths
People educated at Harrow School
English bankers
English entomologists
Charles Rothschild
English Jews
Younger sons of barons
High Sheriffs of Northamptonshire
Suicides in England
Burials at Willesden Jewish Cemetery
1923 suicides